Araj Huma is a village in Bolivia. In 2001 it had a population of 403.

References

Populated places in La Paz Department (Bolivia)